The Lillard-Sprague House was a historic house on Pleasant Grove Street in Rogers, Arkansas.  Built in 1907, it was a wood-frame example of a prow house, a local style with T-shaped layout where the stem of the T projects forward.  In this instance, the projecting section was surrounded by a single-story wraparound porch, supported by Tuscan columns on stone piers.  An addition had been added to the center rear, retaining the house's axial symmetry.

The house was listed on the National Register of Historic Places in 1988, but has since been destroyed.

See also
National Register of Historic Places listings in Benton County, Arkansas

References

Prow houses
Houses on the National Register of Historic Places in Arkansas
Houses completed in 1907
Houses in Rogers, Arkansas
National Register of Historic Places in Benton County, Arkansas